Alfred Werner Maurer (born 3 October 1945) is an international German architect, urban planner, architectural historian, archaeologists and art historian.

Life 
Alfred Werner Maurer studied from 1964 to 1968 at the College of Engineering and Sciences of the Saarland, 1969–1970 at the Ulm School of Design, the Institute for Environmental Planning of the University of Stuttgart and from 1970 to 1972 at the University of Innsbruck Architecture and the Kaiserslautern University of Technology and regional planning . He received his graduate degree specializing in architecture and urban planning. From 1973 to 1977 he studied at the University of the Saarland Art history, Classical archaeology, Prehistory and Early History and Near Eastern archaeology. His professors included Wolfgang Götz, Rolf Hachmann, Friedrich Hiller,  Hans Erich Kubach, Wilhelm Messerer, Winfried Orthmann,  Frauke Stein and  Peter Volkelt. Subsequently, he was a PhD student at Peter Volkelt with the dissertation topic " palace buildings of the 19th Century in France .
In 1973, he participated as a researcher at the University of Saarland in Saarbrücken under the direction of  Rolf Hachmann in the excavations at Tell Kamid al lawz (or Kamid el-Loz) (Kumidi) in Lebanon part. In 1974 he was a research associate at the University of Saarland at the  Winfried Orthmann directed excavation of the 5000-year-old city of Tall plant Munbāqa (also Ekalte (Mumbaqat)) in northern Syria. 1977 Maurer became the excavation director in Mumbaqat in Syria for the Deutsche Orient-Gesellschaft appointed and the University of the Saarland. At the same time, he took a position as professor of urban planning, architecture and archeology in his hometown. At the same time he worked as an architect and architectural historian. Among other things, he was in the 1980s in the reorganization of  Saarbrücken Castle and the History Museum Saar involved.

Alfred Werner Maurer was also active in sports, he was a board member of the German Fencing Association, board member of the National Sports Association Saar,Fencing Federation President Interregio Saar-Lor-Lux-Elsass-Südwest, President of the Federal fencers Saar.

Buildings (selection) 
 Redevelopment Saarbrücken Castle (draft of Gottfried Böhm ) 
 History Museum Saar (with Gottfried Böhm)
 Civic center Dudweiler (department store and community center; design Gottfried Böhm)
 Center for Innovative Production of the University of Saarland in Saarbrücken
 Casino with hotel Saarbrücken in the German-French Garden
 Villas in France, Switzerland and Germany (with Rudolf Olgiati)

Writings (selection)
 Die Baugeschichte des Saarbrücker Schlosses und deren Erforschung. In: Jürgen Karbach, Paul Thomes (ed.):  Beiträge zum Stengel-Symposion anläßlich des 300. Geburtstages von Friedrich Joachim Stengel am 29./30. September 1994 im Saarbrücker Schloß. / Zeitschrift für die Geschichte der Saargegend, 43/1995, pp. 177–217.
 mit Erich Fissabre: Gestaltbild Barockschloss Saarbrücken 1739–1748. Methoden, Arbeitsweisen, Quellen der Rekonstruktion. Selbstverlag, 1980.
 mit Erich Fissabre: Synthese zwischen Alt und Neu. ZIP Zentrum für innovative Produktion in Saarbrücken. In: ZIP Zentrum für innovative Produktion. Saarbrücken 1996, pp. 19–31.
 Reise in den Orient zur Grabung Kāmid el-Lōz 1973. Philologus Verlag, Basel 2006.
 Mumbaqat 1977. Bericht über die von der Deutschen Orient-Gesellschaft mit Mitteln der Universität Saarbrücken unternommene Ausgrabung. Basel 2007.
 Architekturtheorie: Disput François Blondel und Claude Perrault. Der Streit zwischen Francois Blondel und Claude Perrault über den natürlichen Ursprung der architektonischen Proportionen und die Krise der Architekturtheorie (Online Resource) Philologus-Netzwerk Basel (ch)
 Burg und Schloss Saarbrucken (Online Resource) Philologus-Netzwerk Basel (ch)
 mit Erich Fissabre: Die Erforschung des Barockschlosses Saarbrücken, unpubl., 1994.
 (ed.) Konvolut handschriftlicher Faksimilie aus dem Hof- und Staatsarchiv Wien, Nassau-Saarbrücken 1768–1773 in Maschinenschrift, Saarbrücken, 1994.

References

External links
 
 http://eng.archinform.net/arch/108369.htm/ German author, art historian and monument conservator
 Homepage of Alfred Werner Maurer 
 Maurer-Associates-Architects in the www.detail360.de, accessed on 20. August 2013
 Ausgrabung Mumbaqat in the www.detail360.de, accessed on 24. September 2013
 Alfred Werner Maurer in the www.detail360.de, accessed on 20. August 2013
 AWM Notable Alumni accessed on 23. September 2013
 
 Marjorie-Wiki from Villa Sarraz
 Homepage Schloss Saarbrücken

1945 births
Living people
People from Saarbrücken
Archaeologists from Saarland
20th-century German architects
20th-century archaeologists
German urban planners
German art historians
University of Stuttgart alumni
University of Innsbruck alumni
Technical University of Kaiserslautern alumni
German male non-fiction writers